†Borysthenia goldfussiana is an extinct species of small freshwater snail with a gill and an operculum, an aquatic gastropod mollusk in the family Valvatidae, the valve snails.

References

Valvatidae
Extinct gastropods